Sandyford is a suburb of Dublin, Ireland.

Sandyford may also refer to:

 Sandyford, Glasgow, Scotland
 Sandyford, Newcastle upon Tyne, England
 Sandyford, Staffordshire, Stoke-on-Trent, England
 Sandefjord, Norway

See also
 
 Sandford (disambiguation)
 Sandiford (disambiguation)
 Sanford (disambiguation)
 Standiford (disambiguation)
 Zandvoorde (disambiguation)